Serge Lang (May 19, 1927 – September 12, 2005) was a French-American mathematician and activist who taught at Yale University for most of his career. He is known for his work in number theory and for his mathematics textbooks, including the influential Algebra. He received the Frank Nelson Cole Prize in 1960 and was a member of the Bourbaki group.

As an activist, Lang campaigned against the Vietnam War, and also successfully fought against the nomination of the political scientist Samuel P. Huntington to the National Academies of Science. Later in his life, Lang was an HIV/AIDS denialist. He claimed that HIV had not been proven to cause AIDS and protested Yale's research into HIV/AIDS.

Biography and mathematical work
Lang was born in Saint-Germain-en-Laye, close to Paris, in 1927. He had a twin brother who became a basketball coach and a sister who became an actress. Lang moved with his family to California as a teenager, where he graduated in 1943 from Beverly Hills High School. He subsequently graduated with an AB from the California Institute of Technology in 1946. He then received a PhD in mathematics from Princeton University in 1951. He held faculty positions at the University of Chicago, Columbia University (from 1955, leaving in 1971 in a dispute), and Yale University.

Lang studied at Princeton University, writing his thesis titled "On quasi algebraic closure" under the supervision of Emil Artin, and then worked on the geometric analogues of class field theory and diophantine geometry. Later he moved into diophantine approximation and transcendental number theory, proving the Schneider–Lang theorem. A break in research while he was involved in trying to meet 1960s student activism halfway caused him (by his own description) difficulties in picking up the threads afterwards. He wrote on modular forms and modular units, the idea of a 'distribution' on a profinite group, and value distribution theory. He made a number of conjectures in diophantine geometry: Mordell–Lang conjecture, Bombieri–Lang conjecture, Lang–Trotter conjecture, and the Lang conjecture on analytically hyperbolic varieties. He introduced the Lang map, the Katz–Lang finiteness theorem, and the Lang–Steinberg theorem (cf. Lang's theorem) in algebraic groups.

Mathematical books
Lang was a prolific writer of mathematical texts, often completing one on his summer vacation. Most are at the graduate level. He wrote calculus texts and also prepared a book on group cohomology for Bourbaki. Lang's Algebra, a graduate-level introduction to abstract algebra, was a highly influential text that ran through numerous updated editions.  His Steele prize citation stated, "Lang's Algebra changed the way graduate algebra is taught...It has affected all subsequent graduate-level algebra books."  It contained ideas of his teacher, Artin; some of the most interesting passages in Algebraic Number Theory also reflect Artin's influence and ideas that might otherwise not have been published in that or any form.

Awards as expositor

Lang was noted for his eagerness for contact with students. He was described as a passionate teacher who would throw chalk at students who he believed were not paying attention. One of his colleagues recalled: "He would rant and rave in front of his students. He would say, 'Our two aims are truth and clarity, and to achieve these I will shout in class.'" He won a Leroy P. Steele Prize for Mathematical Exposition (1999) from the American Mathematical Society. In 1960, he won the sixth Frank Nelson Cole Prize in Algebra for his paper "Unramified class field theory over function fields in several variables" (Annals of Mathematics, Series 2, volume 64 (1956), pp. 285–325).

Activism

Lang spent much of his professional time engaged in political activism. He was a staunch socialist and active in opposition to the Vietnam War, volunteering for the 1966 anti-war campaign of Robert Scheer (the subject of his book The Scheer Campaign). Lang later quit his position at Columbia in 1971 in protest over the university's treatment of anti-war protesters.

Lang engaged in several efforts to challenge anyone he believed was spreading misinformation or misusing science or mathematics to further their own goals. He attacked the 1977 Survey of the American Professoriate, an opinion questionnaire that Seymour Martin Lipset and E. C. Ladd had sent to thousands of college professors in the United States. Lang said it contained numerous biased and loaded questions. This led to a public and highly acrimonious conflict as detailed in his book The File : Case Study in Correction (1977-1979).

In 1986, Lang mounted what the New York Times described as a "one-man challenge" against the nomination of political scientist Samuel P. Huntington to the National Academy of Sciences. Lang described Huntington's research, in particular his use of mathematical equations to demonstrate that South Africa was a "satisfied society", as "pseudoscience", arguing that it gave "the illusion of science without any of its substance." Despite support for Huntington from the Academy's social and behavioral scientists, Lang's challenge was successful, and Huntington was twice rejected for Academy membership. Huntington's supporters argued that Lang's opposition was political rather than scientific in nature. Lang's detailed description of these events, "Academia, Journalism, and Politics: A Case Study: The Huntington Case", occupies the first 222 pages of his 1998 book Challenges.

Lang kept his political correspondence and related documentation in extensive "files". He would send letters or publish articles, wait for responses, engage the writers in further correspondence, collect all these writings together and point out what he considered contradictions. He often mailed these files to mathematicians and other interested parties throughout the world. Some of the files were published in his books Challenges and The File : Case Study in Correction (1977-1979). His extensive file criticizing Nobel laureate David Baltimore was published in the journal Ethics and Behaviour in January 1993 and in his book Challenges. Lang fought the decision by Yale University to hire Daniel Kevles, a historian of science, because Lang disagreed with Kevles' analysis in The Baltimore Case.

Lang's most controversial political stance was as an HIV/AIDS denialist. He maintained that the prevailing scientific consensus that HIV causes AIDS had not been backed up by reliable scientific research, yet for political and commercial reasons further research questioning the current point of view was suppressed.  In public he was very outspoken about this point and a portion of Challenges is devoted to this issue.

List of books

Pregraduate-level textbooks

Graduate-level textbooks

Other

References

Sources and further reading
 Steele Prize citation and Lang's acceptance (AMS Notices, April 1999)

External links

 
 
 Obituary from the New York Times
Lang's obituary article in the Yale Daily News

People from Saint-Germain-en-Laye
1927 births
2005 deaths
20th-century American mathematicians
21st-century American mathematicians
Nicolas Bourbaki
Number theorists
Princeton University alumni
University of Chicago faculty
Columbia University faculty
Yale University faculty
California Institute of Technology alumni
HIV/AIDS denialists
American anti–Vietnam War activists
French emigrants to the United States
Institute for Advanced Study visiting scholars
Textbook writers
Members of the United States National Academy of Sciences